Harrington Evans Broad (1844 – 8 December 1927) was an English Liberal politician who sat in the House of Commons from 1892 to 1895.

Broad was born at Hitchin, Hertfordshire. He was a Chartered Accountant of Warlingham, Surrey.  In 1892, on the death of the incumbent Henry Wardle, Broad was elected as Member of Parliament for South Derbyshire constituency. He lost the seat in the 1895 general election.

Broad married Zillah Broad in Reigate in 1872. He died in Godstone, Surrey aged 83.

References

External links 
 

1844 births
Liberal Party (UK) MPs for English constituencies
Members of the Parliament of the United Kingdom for constituencies in Derbyshire
UK MPs 1892–1895
1927 deaths
People from Hitchin